"Remote Control" is a song by American rapper Kanye West from his tenth studio album Donda (2021). The song, which features vocals from fellow American rapper Young Thug, was produced by West alongside Cubeatz, Digital Nas, Ojivolta, 88-Keys, Mike Dean and Teddy Walton.

Background
In April 2021, music producer Digital Nas was invited to work with West in Los Angeles after West had heard some of his songs through Mowalola Ogunlesi, who is the design director for West's Yeezy Gap collaboration. Digital Nas gave West a folder of 150 beats, of which West freestyled over approximately 60 of them. Out of those 60 that made the album was two – "Junya" and "Remote Control", with four of them originally expected to make the track listing. Talking about the songs, Digital Nas said: "That sound was so mantra-like. It was just simple. It was like a feeling. [Ye and I] call it monk music".

Young Thug's feature on the track came about after warning West that their friendship would come to an end if he was not to be included on the album, saying "I just hit Kanye like, 'Bro, if I ain't on the album, we are not speaking". Young Thug clarified that his contribution to the song was not inspired or instructed by West.

Soulja Boy originally recorded a verse for the track, although he was not included on the final version of the song. Following the album's release, Soulja Boy shared a snippet of his verse on Instagram, with the caption of the post saying "Fuck Kanye". Soulja Boy expressed distaste towards West secretly taking his verse off, posting a series of tweets aimed at West, saying that "if he didn’t like the verse he should have said that". On November 5, 2021, in an interview with N.O.R.E. on Drink Champs, West said that he believed that Soulja Boy is one of the top 5 most influential artists, and when asked why he was taken off Donda, West joked "You ain't hear that verse?". N.O.R.E. asked "The verse wasn't good?", and West followed up with "Nah, I'll tell you what though, Soulja Boy is the future, Future the future...". Soulja Boy responded to the interview, saying that West's words on Drink Champs stunned him and claimed that West had praised his verse in person.

Pt. 2
Following the album's first listening party, a fan asked West's Kids See Ghosts cohort Kid Cudi via Twitter if he would be featured on the album, to which Cudi responded he was not. However, Cudi's vocals were later heard at the album's second listening session. Cudi would go on to detail how West subsequently reached out to him following the tweet, leading Cudi to record verses for "Moon" and "Remote Control". His verse was previewed at the second listening session on August 6, 2021, but was taken off the song when it was officially released on August 29, 2021, in favor for a sample from the 2012 animated short film Strawinsky and the Mysterious House, known in popular culture as the "Globglogabgalab". On October 27, 2021, the stem player was made available by West. The stem player included three previously unreleased tracks, as well as a version of "Remote Control" that re-adds Kid Cudi's original contribution. "Remote Control pt 2" was officially released as part of the deluxe version of Donda on November 14, 2021.

Personnel

 Kanye West – vocals, production, songwriting
 Young Thug – featured vocals, songwriting
 Cubeatz
 Tim Gomringer – production, songwriting, keyboards
 Kevin Gomringer – production, songwriting, keyboards
 Digital Nas – production, songwriting, programming
 Ojivolta
 Mark Williams – production, songwriting, keyboards
 Raul Cubina – production, songwriting, keyboards
 88-Keys – co-production, songwriting
 Mike Dean – co-production, songwriting
 Teddy Walton – additional production, songwriting, programming
 Brandee Younger – harp

Technical
 Irko – mixing, mastering
 Alejandro Rodriguez-Dawsøn – recording
 Bainz – recording
 Jonathan Pfzar – recording
 Josh Berg – recording
 Mikalai Skrobat – recording
 Roark Bailey – recording
 Will Chason – recording assistance
 Louis Bell – vocal editing
 Cirkut – vocal production

Charts

Weekly charts

Year-end charts

References

2021 songs
Kanye West songs
Young Thug songs
Kid Cudi songs
Song recordings produced by Kanye West
Song recordings produced by Mike Dean (record producer)
Song recordings produced by Cubeatz
Song recordings produced by Digital Nas
Songs written by Kanye West
Songs written by Young Thug
Songs written by Kid Cudi